Kasimovsky District is an administrative and municipal district (raion), one of the twenty-five in Ryazan Oblast, Russia. It is located in the north of the oblast. Its administrative center is the town of Kasimov (which is not administratively a part of the district). Population: 29,602 (2010 Census);

Administrative and municipal status
Within the framework of administrative divisions, Kasimovsky District is one of the twenty-five in the oblast. The town of Kasimov serves as its administrative center, despite being incorporated separately as a town of oblast significance—an administrative unit with the status equal to that of the districts.

As a municipal division, the district is incorporated as Kasimovsky Municipal District. The town of oblast significance of Kasimov is incorporated separately from the district as Kasimov Urban Okrug.

References

Notes

Sources

Districts of Ryazan Oblast
